This is an incomplete list of Statutory Instruments of the United Kingdom in 1974.

 National Health Service (Venereal Diseases) Regulations 1974 S.I. 1974/29
 Judicial Pensions (Widow's and Children's Benefits) Regulations 1974 S.I. 1974/44
 National Health Service (General Medical and Pharmaceutical Services) Regulations 1974 S.I. 1974/160
 Judicial Pensions (Widows' and Children's Benefits) (No. 2) Regulations 1974 S.I. 1974/229
 The Offshore Installation (Construction and Survey) Regulations 1974 S.I. 1974/289 and the associated guidance notes – Offshore Installations: Guidance on the Design, Construction and Certification - replaced by SI 1996/913
 Gloucestershire (Coroners' Districts) Order 1974 S.I. 1974/368
 National Health Service (Service Committees and Tribunal) Regulations 1974 S.I. 1974/455
 National Health Service (General Dental Services) (Scotland) Regulations 1974 S.I. 1974/505
 National Health Service (General Medical and Pharmaceutical Services) (Scotland) Regulations 1974 S.I. 1974/506
 Local Government Superannuation Regulations 1974 S.I. 1974/520
 Great Ouse River Authority (Alteration of Boundaries of the Littleport and Downham Internal Drainage District) Order 1974 S.I. 1974/534
 Crown Roads (Royal Parks) (Application of Road Traffic Enactments) ... S.I. 1974/797
 The Local Government (Successor Parishes) Order 1974 S.I. 1974/569
 The Local Authorities (Miscellaneous Provision) (No. 2) Order 1974 S.I. 1974/595
 The London Borough of Bexley (Wards) Order 1974 S.I. 1974/694
 The Local Authorities (Miscellaneous Provision) (No. 3) Order 1974 S.I. 1974/968
 The Charlwood and Horley (Electoral Divisions and Wards) Order 1974 S.I. 1974/772
 Children and Young Persons Act 1969 (Transitional Modifications to Part I) Order 1974 S.I. 1974/1083
 Industrial Training (Transfer of the Activities of Establishments) Order 1974 S.I. 1974/1154
 Pensions (Increase) (Northern Ireland) Order 1974 S.I. 1974/1267 (N.I. 2)
 Social Security (Consequences of Emergency) (Northern Ireland) Order 1974 S.I. 1974/1268 (N.I. 3)
 The Charlwood and Horley (Electoral Divisions and Wards) (Amendment) Order 1974 S.I. 1974/1353
 Pensions Increase (Annual Review) Order 1974 S.I. 1974/1373
 Health and Safety at Work etc. Act 1974 (Commencement No. 1) Order 1974 S.I. 1974/1439
 Industrial Training (Transfer of the Activities of Establishments) (No. 2) Order 1974 S.I. 1974/1495
 Police Pensions (Amendment) Regulations 1974 S.I. 1974/1533
 Police Pensions (Amendment) (No. 2) Regulations 1974 S.I. 1974/1673
 Merchant Shipping (Seamen's Documents) (Amendment) Regulations 1974 S.I. 1974/1734
 Radioactive Substances (Carriage by Road) (Great Britain) Regulations 1974 S.I. 1974/1735
 Police Pensions (Amendment) (No. 3) Regulations 1974 S.I. 1974/1796
 National Health Service (Charges for Appliances) (Scotland) Regulations 1974 S.I. 1974/1910
 Merchant Shipping (Radio) (Fishing Vessels) Rules 1974 S.I. 1974/1919
 Mines and Quarries Act 1954 to 1971 (Repeals and Modifications) Regulations 1974 S.I. 1974/2013
 Agriculture (Tractor Cabs) Regulations 1974 S.I. 1974/2034
 Home-Grown Cereals Authority Levy Scheme (Approval) Order 1974 S.I. 1974/2083
 Financial Provisions (Northern Ireland) Order 1974 S.I. 1974/2141 (N.I. 4)
 Youth Employment Service (Northern Ireland) Order 1974 S.I. 1974/2144 (N.I. 7)
 Clean Air Enactments (Repeals and Modifications) Regulations 1974 S.I. 1974/2170

References

External links
Legislation.gov.uk delivered by the UK National Archive
UK SI's on legislation.gov.uk
UK Draft SI's on legislation.gov.uk

See also
List of Statutory Instruments of the United Kingdom

Lists of Statutory Instruments of the United Kingdom
Statutory Instruments